George William Banks ( – death unknown) was an English professional rugby league footballer who played in the 1920s, 1930s and 1940s.

Playing career

Championship final appearances 
George Banks played left-, i.e. number 8, in Wigan's 13-4 victory over Huddersfield in the Championship Final during the 1945–46 season at Maine Road, Manchester on Saturday 18 May 1946, and played right-, i.e. number 10, in the 13-4 victory over Dewsbury in the Championship Final during the 1946–47 season at Maine Road, Manchester on Saturday 21 June 1947.

County Cup Final appearances 
George Banks played left-, i.e. number 8, in Wigan's 10-7 victory over Salford in the 1938–39 Lancashire County Cup Final during the 1938–39 season at Station Road, Swinton on Saturday 22 October 1938, played right-, i.e. number 10, in the 3-7 defeat by Widnes in the 1945–46 Lancashire County Cup Final during the 1945–46 season at Wilderspool Stadium, Warrington on Saturday 27 October 1945, played right- in the 9-3 victory over Belle Vue Rangers in the 1946–47 Lancashire County Cup Final during the 1946–47 season at Station Road, Swinton on Saturday 26 October 1946, played right- in the 10-7 victory over Belle Vue Rangers in the 1947–48 Lancashire County Cup Final during the 1947–48 season at Wilderspool Stadium, Warrington on Saturday 1 November 1947,

Club career 
Born in Castleford, Yorkshire, Banks started his professional career in 1929 with Huddersfield, who his brother, Thomas, also played for. He failed to establish a regular place in the first team, appearing just four times before moving to Dewsbury in 1931. He made 115 appearances for Dewsbury until 1935, when he moved to the newly formed London-based team Streatham & Mitcham. He appeared 50 times for the club before leaving to join Wigan.

References

External links 
 Statistics at wigan.rlfans.com

 Search for "Banks" at rugbyleagueproject.org

1900s births
Castleford Tigers players
Dewsbury Rams players
English rugby league players
Huddersfield Giants players
Rugby league players from Castleford
Rugby league props
Streatham and Mitcham R.L.F.C. players
Wigan Warriors players
Year of death missing
York Wasps players